Stockton Methodist Church is a historic church on the east side of Hwy. 59 in Stockton, Alabama.  It was built in 1929 and added to the National Register of Historic Places in 1988.

References

Methodist churches in Alabama
Churches on the National Register of Historic Places in Alabama
National Register of Historic Places in Baldwin County, Alabama
Neoclassical architecture in Alabama
Churches completed in 1929
Churches in Baldwin County, Alabama
Neoclassical church buildings in the United States